Kampfgeschwader 30 (KG 30) was a Luftwaffe bomber wing during World War II.

Service history
Formed on 15 November 1939 in Greifswald. I Gruppe formed 1 September, II Gruppe on 23 September and III Gruppe on 1 January 1940, based in Greifswald then Barth. IV Gruppe was formed 27 Oct 1940 as Erg.Sta./KG 30, and in April 1941 was increased to Gruppe strength. KG 30 was equipped with the Junkers Ju 88 and was initially trained as an anti-shipping and maritime attack unit: at the start of October 1939 it was attached to X. Fliegerkorps. On 16 October 1939 it attacked naval ships anchored off Rosyth Dockyard in the Firth of Forth.

II./KG 30 operated under X. Fliegerkorps for Operation Weserübung, the invasion of Norway. The unit Ju 88s engaged Allied shipping as its main target. On 9 April 1940, in cooperation with high-level bombing Heinkel He 111s of KG 26,  Ju 88s of II./KG 30 dive-bombed  and damaged the battleship  and sank the destroyer . The unit lost four Ju 88s in the action, the highest single loss of KG 30 throughout the campaign.

On 9 June 1940 Kampfgeschwader 30 took over Chièvres Air Base. On 17 June 1940 bombers from II./KG 30 sank RMS Lancastria off St Nazaire as she evacuated troops during Operation Aerial, killing some 5,800 Allied personnel. On 15 October 1940 III./KG 30 was redesignated Ergänzungskampfgruppe 6 and a new III./KG 30 was formed in Amsterdam-Schiphol from III./KG 4.

In September 1942  was active against Arctic convoy PQ 18. Attacking PQ 18, the group carried out a massed torpedo attack known as the Golden Comb, developed as an anti-convoy measure. This was initially successful, sinking several ships, though the group suffered heavy losses. On 23 November 1944 Kampfgeschwader 30 was redesignated as Kampfgeschwader(J)30, converting to a fighter unit. The unit was disbanded 18 April 1945.

Commanding officers
 Oberstleutnant Walter Loebel, 15 November 1939 – 16 August 1940
 Oberst Herbert Rieckhoff, 17 August 1940 – 20 October 1940
 Oberstleutnant Erich Bloedorn, October 1940 – May 1943
 Oberstleutnant Wilhelm Kern, 18 May 1943 – 10 September 1943
 Oberstleutnant Sigmund-Ulrich Freiherr von Gravenreuth, September 1943 – 16 October 1944
 Oberst Bernhard Jope, October 1944 – February 1945
 Oberst Hanns Heise, February 1945 – May 1945

References
Citations

Bibliography

 Bergstrom, Christer (2007a). Barbarossa - The Air Battle: July–December 1941. London: Chevron/Ian Allan. .
 Bergström, Christer (2007b). Stalingrad – The Air Battle: 1942 through January 1943. Midland Puplishing, Hinkley. 
 Bergström, Christer (2007c). Kursk – The Air Battle: July 1943. Midland Puplishing, Hinkley. 
 Bergstrom, Christer (2008). Bagration to Berlin: The Final Air Battles in the East: 1944–1945. Ian Allan. .
 Bergström, Christer (2015). The Battle of Britain: An Epic Conflict Revisited. Casemate: Oxford. .
 Bergström, Christer; Mikhailov, Andrey (2001). Black Cross / Red Star Air War Over the Eastern Front, Volume II, Resurgence January–June 1942. Pacifica, California: Pacifica Military History. .
 Brookes, Andrew. Air War Over Russia. Ian Allan Publishing. 2003. 
 Christopher Shores (2002). Great Air Battles of World War II. Grub Street. 
 Christopher Hough and Denis Richard (1990). The Battle of Britain - the Jubilee History. Guild Publishing. Previously published by Hodder & Stoughton, 1989. 
 Dierich, Wolfgang (2002). Kampfgeschwader 55 "Greif", Eine Chronik aus Dokumenten und Berichten 1937-1945. Motorbuch. .
 de Zeng, H.L; Stankey, D.G; Creek, E.J. Bomber Units of the Luftwaffe 1933-1945; A Reference Source, Volume 1. Ian Allan Publishing, 2007. 
 Goss, Chris. (2000). The Luftwaffe Bombers' Battle of Britain. Crecy, Manchester. 
 Goss, Chris. (2010). The Luftwaffe's Blitz: The Inside Story, November 1940—May 1941. Crecy, Manchester. 
 Hall and Quinlan (2000). KG55. Red Kite. .
 Hooton, E.R. (1994). Phoenix Triumphant: The Rise and Rise of the Luftwaffe. Arms & Armour, .
 Hooton, E. R (2007b). Luftwaffe at War; Blitzkrieg in the West. London: Chevron/Ian Allan. .
 Hooton, E. R (2007a). Luftwaffe at War: Gathering Storm 1933-1939 Classic Publications. .
 Hooton, E.R. (1997). Eagle in Flames: The Fall of the Luftwaffe. Arms & Armour Press. 
 Jackson, Robert. Air War Over France, 1939-1940. Ian Allan, London. 1974. 
 Mason, Francis (1969). Battle Over Britain. McWhirter Twins, London. 
 Muller, Richard (1992). The German Air War in Russia. Nautical & Aviation Publishing. Baltimore, Maryland. 
 Parker, Nigel (2013). Luftwaffe Crash Archive: Volume 1: A Documentary History of Every Enemy Aircraft Brought Down Over the United Kingdom, September 1939 – 14 August 1940. Red Kite, London.

External links

Kampfgeschwader 030
Military units and formations established in 1939
Military units and formations disestablished in 1945